Danny Barrett (born March 23, 1990) is an American rugby player who plays as a forward. He previously played for the U.S. national rugby team, and also played for the U.S. national rugby sevens team. Barrett was in the Men's Eagles Sevens pool for the World Rugby Sevens Series until late 2021. Barrett's strong play during the 2016–17 season landed him one of the seven spots on the 2017 season Dream Team, alongside teammate Perry Baker. In December of 2021, Barrett signed to play for the Houston SaberCats of Major League Rugby (MLR).

Barrett played for the USA Selects during the 2013 IRB Americas Rugby Championship. Barrett debuted for the Eagles on June 7, 2014 when he came on as a sub in a match against Scotland. Barrett then started two matches during the 2014 Pacific Nations Cup.

College and club rugby
Barrett played college rugby at the University of California, Berkeley. He played with the men's Collegiate All-Americans during their June 2013 tour of New Zealand.

Barrett was a member of the San Francisco Golden Gate sevens team at the inaugural 2013 World Club 7s in London.
Barrett also spent time on a one-month trial with Gloucester of the English Premiership during fall 2014.

References

External links
 
 
 
 Danny Barrett at USA Rugby
 

1990 births
American rugby union players
People from Pacifica, California
Living people
United States international rugby sevens players
Olympic rugby sevens players of the United States
Rugby sevens players at the 2016 Summer Olympics
Sportspeople from California
United States international rugby union players
Rugby sevens players at the 2020 Summer Olympics
Rugby union flankers
Rugby union number eights
Houston SaberCats players